Kolovrat or Kolowrat may refer to:

People
Kolowrat family, a Czech noble family

People with the surname
Evpaty Kolovrat (c.1200 – 1238), Russian knight
Johann Kollowrat (1748–1816), Bohemian noble and Austrian field marshal
Franz Anton von Kolowrat-Liebsteinsky (1778–1861), Bohemian noble and Austrian statesman
Alexander Kolowrat (1886–1927), Bohemian noble and Austrian film producer
Alois Josef Krakovský z Kolovrat (1759–1833), Roman Catholic archbishop of Prague
Henry Kolowrat, Jr. (born 1933), American fencer
Samantha Kolowratová (born 1996), Czech ice hockey player

Places
Kolovrat (mountain ridge), a mountain ridge on the border between Italy and Slovenia
Mount Kolovrat or Kalourat, a mountain in the Malaita Island in Solomon Islands
Kolovrat, Zagorje ob Savi, a settlement in the municipality of Zagorje ob Savi, Slovenia
Kolovrat, Tuzla, a settlement in the municipality of Tuzla in Bosnia and Herzegovina
, a settlement and necropolis near today's Prijepolje, Serbia
, a theatre in Prague, Czech Republic

Other
Kolovrat (symbol), Slavic neo-pagan symbol of the Sun
Kolovrat (band), a Russian music band
Furious (2017 film), also known as Legend of Kolovrat, a Russian film

See also

Czech-language surnames